The Navy oceanographic meteorological automatic device (NOMAD) is an anchored automated weather station developed shortly after World War II and still used today.

Advantages
The NOMAD has a boat-shaped hull made from aluminum, and it provides relatively high cost effectiveness and excellent long-term survivability in severe weather. These buoys are highly directional and have a quick rotational response and stability. There have been no known capsizings of 6-meter NOMAD hulls. The relatively small size of the NOMAD allows for easy transport across land.

Development
The buoy's performance was satisfactory, but its limited size significantly restricted the buoy's use in other areas.

In July 1946, the Bureau of Ships became involved in a program to develop automatic weather station buoys. As a perspective part of this program, they conducted a preliminary investigation into the feasibility of mooring a buoy. The investigation concluded that the buoy's hull size was of insufficient length to be moored in 3600 ft of water. To support such a mooring, a similar shaped hull had to be 20 ft (6 m) long and displace approximately 20,000 lb. This was to become the prototype of the buoy now known as the NOMAD.

The NOMAD was the first of such stations to be anchored successfully for a substantial period in more than 11,000 feet of water. It was also the first anchored automated station to detect formation of a hurricane and alert weather observers on land.
The station was developed as part of the ocean test and evaluation program, started in 1957, for the Bureau of Naval Weapons, with the National Bureau of Standards responsible for technical direction.

Use
Today, the NOMAD is used for monitoring meteorological, oceanographic and water quality parameters, all over the world. The U.S. National Weather Service currently has 17 NOMADs in operation. NOMADs have also been used by the Meteorological Service of Canada for over 25 years and there are now 3 NOMADs monitoring Canadian waters.

References

Meteorological instrumentation and equipment
Meteorological stations
Naval meteorology